The 1983–84 Czechoslovak Extraliga season was the 41st season of the Czechoslovak Extraliga, the top level of ice hockey in Czechoslovakia. 12 teams participated in the league, and Dukla Jihlava won the championship.

Regular season

1. Liga-Qualification

External links
History of Czechoslovak ice hockey

Czechoslovak Extraliga seasons
Czech
1983–84 in Czechoslovak ice hockey